No Child of Mine is a 1997 British docudrama-television film on ITV starring Brooke Kinsella. It documents the true case of a girl named Kerry who was sexually abused throughout her childhood. It premiered on Tuesday, February 25, 1997 in the United Kingdom.

Plot
13-year-old Kerry, whose last name is not disclosed for safety reasons, endures problems at home with her parents fighting each other and eventually separating. Shortly after, her mother's new boyfriend, Graham, moves in with them and begins physically and sexually abusing her. Her mother, Linda, also occasionally takes part in the abuse, making her daughter perform oral sex on her. Kerry's father, Jim, a construction worker, attempts to manipulate her into prostitution, something she is unaware of until a few truck drivers "borrow" her.

Kerry's situation worsens at home and she decides to run away after Jim attacks Linda and Graham for abusing Kerry. One of her class teachers, Paul suddenly becomes aware of her situation and attempts to have her placed in childcare. The class teacher, social workers, and friends attempt to file charges of sexual and physical abuse on Kerry's behalf against her mother's boyfriend. However, the Crown Prosecution Service later declines to continue the case, arguing there is not enough legal evidence to support the allegations. Kerry is placed into foster care, but struggles to settle in and repeatedly destroys property, making it impossible for the foster family to keep her.

Kerry is then placed into a care home. She is seduced by a pimp (who knows exactly how Kerry feels about living with a stubborn mother and stepfather like hers who don't understand her), and for some time willingly leases herself for profit. A social worker in the childcare home also begins to sexually abuse her. Feeling helpless, Kerry frequently visits her class teacher and tries to move in with him, but he is unable to care for her. He consults his friend and child-support agent to have Kerry placed somewhere safe, but her case cannot be given any more priority than that of any other child.

Towards the end of the film, Kerry runs away and finds a small and peaceful care home in a rural location. They decline her offer of money, which she obtained by prostituting herself. Traumatized, Kerry does not speak for the past 5 days there. Then 12 days later, as she begins to trust the people in the home, she begins to reveal her story after a woman in the home saw inside that Kerry's been through an abusive life. While her abusers did not suffer any legal consequences, she was finally free from her abuse. It's then revealed that she went on to study at a university.

Cast
 Brooke Kinsella as Kerry
 Colin Salmon as Paul
 Bill Geraghty as Jim
 Sharon Small as Linda
 Geoffrey Church as Graham
 Ginny Holder as Bridget
 Darren Tighe as Mick
 Kate Byers as Matty
 Katie Lyons as Tracy
 Jill Marie Cooper as Lucy (as Jill Cooper)
 Billie Holmes as Paula
 Anna Waters as Donna
 Bridget Hodson as Miss Lewis
 Alex Knight as Steve
 Phil Herne as Shane
 Ravin J. Ganatra as Len
 Edward Highmore as Ray
 Karl Jenkinson as Derek
 Judy Norman as Vanessa
 James Powell as Peter
 Jason Hall as Mike
 Julie Smith as Carly
 Ralph Van Dijk as Male Doctor
 Melanie Ramsay as P.C. Kate Booth
 Lavinia Bertram as Female Doctor
 Nita Gale as Sally
 Jason Stracey as Vic
 Annie Hayes as Pam
 Natalie Ratcliff as Denise
 Barry McNicholl as Gary
 Kay Dacey as First Girl
 Diane Adderley as Childline Voice (voice)

Production
The film was written by Guy Hibbert for Meridian Broadcasting/ITV. It was produced and directed by Peter Kosminsky.

References

External links
No Child of Mine on IMDb
No Child of Mine on filmaffinity

British television films
Films about child sexual abuse
Films about child abuse
1997 films
Prostitution in British television
Films about dysfunctional families
Films about domestic violence
ITV television dramas
Television series by ITV Studios
Television shows produced by Meridian Broadcasting